The Surmalu uezd was a county (uezd) of the Erivan Governorate of the Caucasus Viceroyalty of the Russian Empire.  It bordered the governorate's Etchmiadzin and Erivan uezds to the north, the Kars Oblast to the west, Persia to the east, and the Ottoman Empire to the south. The district made up most of the Iğdır Province of present-day Turkey.  As part of the Russian Transcaucasus, the Surmalu uezd possessed economical importance for its abundantly rich salt mines in Kulp (Tuzluca), and spiritual importance to Armenians as the location of the culturally significant Mount Ararat. The administrative centre of the county was Igdyr (present-day Iğdır).

Etymology
The district's name derives from the old Armenian city Surmari which evolved from Surb Mari. The castle of Surmari still stands today in the village  near the Armenia–Turkey border within the Tuzluca district of Turkey's Iğdır Province.

History
A part of Persia's Erivan Khanate, Surmalu was annexed by the Russian Empire in the Treaty of Turkmenchay in the aftermath of the Russo-Persian War of 1826–28.  The district was first administered as part of the Armenian Oblast and then the Erivan Governorate.  In 1829, Baltic German explorer Friedrich Parrot of the University of Dorpat (Tartu) traveled to Surmalu as part of his expedition to climb Mount Ararat.  Accompanied by Armenian writer Khachatur Abovian and four others, Parrot made the first ascent of Ararat in recorded history from the Armenian monastery of St. Hakob in Akhuri (modern Yenidoğan).  

After the Russian Revolution, Surmalu was briefly governed by the First Republic of Armenia from 1918 to 1920, until it was occupied in 1920 and formally ceded to Turkey by the treaties of Moscow and Kars, following Armenia's defeat in the Turkish-Armenian War and subsequent Sovietization.

Administrative divisions 
The subcounties (uchastoks) of the Surmalu uezd in 1913 were as follows:

Demographics

Russian Empire estimate (1886) 
According to the Russian family lists accounts from 1886, of the total 71,066 inhabitants of the district, 34,351 were Tatars (48.3%), 22,096 Armenians (31.1%), and 14,619 Kurds (20.6%).

Russian Empire Census 
The plurality of the population indicated Tatar to be their mother tongue, with significant Armenian and Kurdish speaking minorities.

Kavkazskiy kalendar

1910 

1917 
The statistics indicated Shia Muslims to be the plurality of the population of the uezd, followed closely by Armenians, Kurds and Yazidis:

Settlements 
According to the 1897 census, there were 51 settlements in the Surmalu uezd with a population over 500 inhabitants. The religious composition of the settlements was as follows:

Notes

References

Bibliography 

History of Iğdır Province
Uezds of Erivan Governorate
Mount Ararat